Løvenskiold is a Dano-Norwegian noble family of German origin. Members of the family now live primarily in Norway. Originally named Leopoldus, it was one of the first patrician Norwegian families to buy noble status, in 1739, when it was also granted the surname Løvenskiold.

History
The Løvenskiold family descend from merchant Herman Leopoldus (died 1696), who immigrated from Lübeck to Christiania (now Oslo, Norway). His son, also named Herman Leopoldus (1677–1750), became quite wealthy. Both he and his son, Herman Løvenskiold (1701-1759), were ennobled by letters patent in 1739, by paying the King's private fund (partikulærkassen). At the same time, they received the surname Løvenskiold (lit. ‘Lion Shield’). His grandson was Chamberlain Herman Leopoldus Løvenskiold (1739-1799). His great-grandson Severin Løvenskiold (1743–1818) was made a baron (Norwegian: baron or friherre). He was the father of Severin Løvenskiold (1777–1856) who served as Governor-general of Norway.

Property
Members of the family have owned a number of historic homes in Denmark and Norway including  Løvenborg Castle (Løvenborg Slot) at Merløse in Holbæk, Holden Manor (Holden hovedgård) at Ulefoss in Telemark and Fossum Manor (Fossum hovedgård) at Fossum Ironworks in  Skien.
Other family estates included Vækerø Manor west of Bærums Verk in Bærum and the Ask estate in Ringerike (Ask storgård i Ringerike).

The name is also given to the family's privately owned company Løvenskiold-Vækerø, headquartered at Ullern. The holding company owns vast tracts of woodland in and around Oslo, Akershus, Oppland,  Buskerud and Telemark, as well as the building materials retail chain Maxbo.

Coats of arms

Notable family members
See :Category:Løvenskiold family.

See also
 Danish nobility
 Norwegian nobility

References

Literature
Salmonsens Konversationsleksikon (Copenhagen: J H Schultz Forlag, second edition. 1915 to 1930).
 Danmarks Adels Aarbog, Copenhagen 1949
Axel Løvenskiold and Herman L. Løvenskiold: Slekten Løvenskiold gjennom 300 år i Norge, Oslo 1974
 Hans Cappelen: Norske Slektsvåpen (Norwegian Family Coats of Arms) with an English Summary, Oslo 1969 (2nd ed. 1976), p. 31 and 161

External links
Løvenskiold official website
Løvenborg Castle

 
Danish noble families
Norwegian noble families
Norwegian families
Patriciate of Norway
Families of German ancestry